Francisco de Paula Andrade Troconis (1840–1915) was a Venezuelan engineer and journalist.  He facilitated the reconstruction of Cucuta's streets after the earthquake of 1875.

Venezuelan civil engineers
Venezuelan journalists
1840 births
1915 deaths